Azhagu Nila (titled onscreen as Azhaku Nila) is a 1962 Indian Tamil language drama film directed by S. Ragavan and produced by Raagavan Productions.

Plot

Cast 

 Kalyan Kumar
 Malini
 Vasanthi
 K. A. Thangavelu
 R. Muthuraman
 V. K. Ramasamy
 T. K. Ramachandran
 M. S. S. Bhagyam
 Baby Padmini
 Baby Mangalam
 K. Sairam
 Lakshmikantam
 V. P. S. Mani
 S. S. Maninathan
 Vairam Krishnamoorthy
 Master Dasarathan
 Master Suresh
 V. Nagayya (guest appearance)
 M. K. Mustafa (guest appearance)

Production 
The film was shot on a 35 mm film. The film length was 14,429 feet and was in 16 reels.

Soundtrack 
The music was composed by K. V. Mahadevan, with lyrics written by A. Maruthakasi. The songs "Manithan Ellaam Therindhu Kondaan" and "Moongil Marakaattinile" became famous. The song "Chinna Chinna Rojaa" is set to the raga Pahadi.

References

Bibliography

External links 

1960s Tamil-language films
1962 drama films
1962 films
Films scored by K. V. Mahadevan
Indian drama films